The 1980 Berlin Marathon was the 7th running of the annual marathon race held in Berlin, West Germany, held on 28 September. West Germany's Ingo Sensburg won the men's race in 2:16:48 hours, while the women's race was won by West Germany's Gerlinde Püttmann in 2:47:18. A total of 294 runners finished the race, comprising 276 men and 18 women.

Results

Men

Women

References 

 Results. Association of Road Racing Statisticians. Retrieved 2020-06-24.
 Berlin Marathon results archive. Berlin Marathon. Retrieved 2020-06-24.

External links 
 Official website

1980
Berlin Marathon
1980s in West Berlin
Berlin Marathon
Berlin Marathon